Bigrigg  is a village in the English county of Cumbria and within the boundaries of the historic county of Cumberland.

Bigrigg is 2 miles north of the town of Egremont on the A595 road. Bigrigg Moor is surrounded by farmland and watered by the River Ehen. Deep hollows in the area attest to iron ore mining as far back as medieval times. Bigrigg's calcite deposits were considered to be of the highest quality.

History 
In 1829, there were three different companies mining eight pits in the area. Iron ore mining continued to expand from this time. Further encouragement for mining resulted when Whitehaven, Cleator and Egremont Railway opened for goods traffic in 1855. Pits often flooded due to the proximity of the River Ehen, in nearby Egremont, so the mining companies diverted the river. By the late 1800s some mines were closing in the area while others continued to open. In 1924 a mine disaster at the Croft Pit in Bigrigg trapped ten men for 28 hours before they were rescued. By 1932 all the mines w closed.

Church 
St John's Church in the village was built by C.J. Ferguson in 1878–80 in the Decorated style. Its stained glass memorial windows are by Charles Kempe.

Village Hall 
The village got its first 'Jubilee Hall' in 1935, and the village turned out for its official opening, unfortunately, hearsay says that the hall blew down in a heavy wind within a few years of opening.

Old School and Chapel 
The school was opened in 1868 and closed in 1968, it appears that it has been extended at least three times during its history, it has recently been converted into apartments but the exterior structure has not been altered.

Pub 
The Old Captains House (formerly Old Captain's Table, Ship).

Plane crash at Bigrigg in 1947 
During a routine training flight from its base at RAF Silloth a mechanical failure prompted a forced landing. The pilot chose a field near St John's Church at Bigrigg as he came in to land the wing of the aircraft struck a tree and it span onto the ground bursting into flames. What remained of the aircraft continued skidding across the ground breaking up as it went. The cockpit crossed a small road (A595) Narrowly missing a van and ended up on the grass verge burning fiercely. The crew escaped unhurt but badly shaken, they were taken to hospital by the van driver. The local police placed a guard on the aircraft until it was removed by a salvage team.

See also 

 Listed buildings in Egremont, Cumbria

References

External links 

Cumbria County History Trust: Egremont (nb: provisional research only – see Talk page)

Villages in Cumbria
Egremont, Cumbria